La Course à l'échalote is a 1975 French comedy film directed by Claude Zidi.

Plot 
Young and dynamic, founded with power from the "20th Century Bank", Pierre Vidal regularly spies with his binoculars his partner Janet, who works in a hairdressing salon. Fed up with being constantly watched, she takes advantage to excite his jealousy. His boss has taken a few days of vacation, and Pierre is in charge to replace him. More nervous than ever of this enormous responsibility, he will soon have to take to the coffer halls a certain Monsieur de Rovère, who came to bring the transfer of shares act of the Alcazar, the famous Parisian cabaret. But the famous briefcase containing the documents is stolen on their sight.

Cast 
 Pierre Richard ... Pierre Vidal
 Jane Birkin ... Janet
 Michel Aumont ... Commissaire Brunet
 Marc Dolnitz ... Marc
 Amadeus August ... Gunther
 Henri Déus ... Mike
 Luis Rego ... Frantz
 Catherine Allégret ... Nicole
 André Bézu ... André
 Jean Martin ... bank director
 Claude Dauphin ... Bertrand de Rovère
 Philippe Dehesdin ... Philippe
 Paul Cambo ... CEO of the bank
 Jean Bouchaud ... Brunet's assistant

Additional information 
The film took place in Cherbourg-Octeville, Manche, and in Brighton, England.
Claude Zidi, Pierre Richard and Jane Birkin had also starred together in Lucky Pierre, released one year before.

External links 

1975 films
French comedy films
1975 comedy films
Films directed by Claude Zidi
1970s French-language films
1970s French films